Greenwood is a financial services company based in Atlanta, Georgia. First announced in October 2020, the company had 500,000 prospective members by January of the following year. Originally scheduled to open in early 2021, the bank's services were delayed due to "unexpected high demand", first to July 2021, and then to the end of the year, with general public access in early 2022. The company offers its debit card and banking services through a partnership with Coastal Community Bank.

History 
Greenwood was founded by former Atlanta mayor Andrew Young, rapper–activist Michael "Killer Mike" Render, and media executive Ryan Glover with $3 million of private investors to address a lack of banking services for people of color and representation of them in traditional banks. It hopes that its competition will encourage bigger banks to reach more communities of color.

In April 2021, Greenwood announced that they developed a partnership with MasterCard and they will issue the platform’s first debit cards.

On August 05, 2021, Greenwood announced the launch of Greenwood Studios. Greenwood Content Studios will produce essential personal finance content targeted at the Black and Latino community covering topics like savings, investing, credit building, entrepreneurship, and wealth management.

See also 
Black capitalism
Banking in the United States

References

External links

Greenwood Studios

American companies established in 2020
2020 establishments in the United States
Banks based in Georgia (U.S. state)
Banks established in 2020
Black-owned companies of the United States
2020 establishments in Georgia (U.S. state)
Companies based in Georgia (U.S. state)
Financial services companies of the United States
Neobanks